Can Ellen Be Saved is a 1974 American made-for-television drama film directed by Harvey Hart and starring Leslie Nielsen, Katherine Cannon, Michael Parks and John Saxon. The film premiered as the ABC Movie of the Week on February 5, 1974.

Cast
Leslie Nielsen as Arnold Lindsey
Katherine Cannon as Ellen Lindsey
Michael Parks as Joseph
John Saxon as James Hallbeck
Louise Fletcher as Bea Lindsey
Rutanya Alda as Rachael
Christina Hart as Mary
William Katt as Bob
Kathleen Quinlan as Melissa
Scott Colomby as Randy

See also
 List of American films of 1974

External links

1974 television films
1974 films
1974 drama films
ABC Movie of the Week
Films directed by Harvey Hart
American drama television films
1970s English-language films
1970s American films